Boris-Claude Nguéma Békalé (born 7 December 1984) is Gabonese footballer who plays goalkeeper for USM Libreville and the Gabon national football team. Békalé was born in the Kango district. In the past he has also played for FC 105 Libreville, Delta Téléstar, and Tout Puissant Akwembe.

He was a reserve goalkeeper for Gabon at the 2010 Africa Cup of Nations finals in Angola.

References

External links

1984 births
Living people
Gabonese footballers
Gabon international footballers
2010 Africa Cup of Nations players
People from Estuaire Province
Association football goalkeepers
21st-century Gabonese people